War and Peace is a 1915 Russian film written and co-directed by Vladimir Gardin, based on the 1869 novel by Leo Tolstoy.

External links
 

Films of the Russian Empire
Films based on War and Peace
1915 films